Small Moral Works is a collection of 24 writings (dialogues and fictional essays) by the Italian poet and philosopher Giacomo Leopardi, written between 1824 and 1832.

The book was first published in 1827, then in 1834, with changes, and in its last form in Naples (1835), in a censored edition; Antonio Ranieri, a longtime friend of Leopardi's, had it published in the original text in 1845.

Small Moral Works expresses most of the ideas collected in the Zibaldone di pensieri.

The themes discussed in these Works are: the relationship between man and history, between man and other men, and, most importantly, between man and Nature, of which Leopardi develops a personal philosophical view; a comparison of past values and the present, static, degenerate situation; the power of illusions, glory and boredom.

Unlike Leopardi's Canti, Small Moral Works was written almost entirely in 1824. Different editions show the addition of later dialogues and other adjustments.

Background 
The works reflect the conviction that reason, far from being the cause of man's unhappiness, is the only means by which man can avoid despair. Leopardi reached this final point of his reflection about human condition in the years 1822–1824, and in 1824 he conceived the "Operette morali", which collected and elaborated in a dramatic and ironic expression the philosophical research developed in the Zibaldone. In this period, Leopardi, believing that his lyrical voice has vanished, devoted himself to philosophical prose. A first idea of this work can be traced in the plan of some  "prosette satiriche" (satirical prose), "alla maniera di Luciano" (following the style of Lucian). In Italian literature, nothing similar to the Operette can be found. Leopardi imitates Lucian's comical style with wit and humor, and moves through different levels of language. He even mixes various genres and themes.

Apart from Lucian, the most significant models in literary style come from the Enlightenment. Leopardi appreciates Fontenelle for his "leggerezza" (lightness), while in Dialogo della Natura e di un Islandese, one can perceive some of Voltaire's cynicism. Among the Italians, Leopardi admired Ariosto, whose "comical style" he imitates in Dialogo della Terra e della Luna. The extensive knowledge of a great number of works, both philosophical and scientific, is the basis for the humorous and frivolous erudition that Leopardi ironically flaunted. A philological research about the sources that Leopardi cites or merely re-uses in the Operette, in a constant intertextual dialogue, is still lacking.

Analysis
This book is particularly important in the evolution of Leopardi's ideology, and the dialogues have intense lyrical value. As Mario Fubini observed, in the Operette one finds some myths-concepts: happiness, pleasure, love, hope, nature, which are also central themes in the Canti. Happiness is absurd and impossible, but can seem lovable in its deceptive apparitions; pleasure is only a vain ghost; hope inspires pleasant imaginations even if it has no basis; love is a rare miracle that can give man the only real happiness, though short-lived; nature is indifferent or hostile to men, who anyway feel fascinated by natural beauty.

The title 
The title ties the satirical form with the moral purpose. Operette is a humble diminutive: these are short texts, which the author considers small both in size and in value. Their shortness enhances the bright philosophical and poetic strength, while morali stresses the philosophical subject. There is an implicit link to Opuscula moralia by Plutarch. The title comes also from the practical message: since modern philosophy with its truth makes man unhappy, going back to ancient passions and imaginations could make life less unbearable or, at least, suggest ways to soothe sorrow.

Themes 
The themes revolve around the philosophical ideas of the author: the relationship of mankind with History and Nature, the comparison with the valours of the past and the degenerated situation of the present, illusions, glory and boredom.

One of the most famous dialogues is the Dialogo della Natura e di un Islandese, in which the author expresses his main philosophical ideas, through the imaginary meeting, "in the heart of Africa", between a simple man coming from Iceland and a giant, beautiful and terrible woman, Nature, who has been chasing and oppressing him everywhere.

Another important text is the Dialogo di Plotino e di Porfirio, in which two ancient philosophers, Plotinus and Porphyry, debate on the meaning of life and the choice of death as a possible exit from the senseless existence. The dialogue ends by refusing suicide, not in the name of superior rules or religious creeds, but in the name of human solidarity. Men have so many causes of sorrow that it would be wrong to add them another one, as the loss of a friend or a loved person. Instead, says Plotinus, "let us help each other to endure this struggle of life, which anyway will be short". In the earlier poems Bruto minore and Ultimo canto di Saffo, suicide is presented, instead, as the action of a great soul rejecting cowardice and bleakness of life.

The last dialogue, Dialogo di Tristano e di un Amico, reflects Leopardi's experience and thoughts in the person of Tristano. The name of this character is inspired by the famous legendary hero, and by Laurence Sterne's Tristram Shandy. The incipit describes the "Operette" themselves as a "melancholic book", and "a desperate one". Later, however, Tristan ironically expresses admiration for the new times and for the optimistic faith in a better future, but he ends up by proudly affirming his refusal of all illusions, and by courageously facing "tutte le conseguenze di una filosofia dolorosa, ma vera (all the consequences of an agonizing but true philosophy)". Many similarities can be found with the themes of "La Ginestra".

Structure
This is the list of the dialogues and essays, in the last edition:
 Storia del genere umano, (History of the human kind)(January 19 / February 7 1824)
 Dialogo di Ercole e di Atlante, (Dialogue between Hercules and Atlas)(February 10 / February 13, 1824)
 Dialogo della Moda e della Morte, (Dialogue between Fashion and Death)(February 15 / February 18, 1824)
 Proposta di premi fatta all'Accademia dei Sillografi, (Proposal for prizes at the Academy of the Sillographes)(February 22 / February 25, 1824)
 Dialogo di un Folletto e di uno Gnomo, (Dialogue between a Pixie and a Gnome)(March 2 / March 6, 1824)
 Dialogo di Malambruno e di Farfarello, (Dialogue between Malambruno and Farfarello)(April 1 / April 3, 1824)
 Dialogo della Natura e di un'Anima, (Dialogue between Nature and a Soul)(April 9 / April 14, 1824)
 Dialogo della Terra e della Luna, (Dialogue between the Earth and the Moon)(April 24 / April 28, 1824)
 La scommessa di Prometeo, (The bet of Prometheus)(April 30 / May 8, 1824)
 Dialogo di un fisico e di un metafisico, (Dialogue between a Physicist and a Metaphysicist)(May 14 / May 19, 1824)
 Dialogo della Natura e di un Islandese, (Dialogue between Nature and an Icelander)(May 21 / May 30, 1824)
 Dialogo di Torquato Tasso e del suo Genio familiare, (Dialogue between Torquato Tasso and his Familial Genius)(June 1 / June 10, 1824)
 Dialogo di Timandro e di Eleandro, (Dialogue between Timandro and Eleandro)(June 14 / June 24, 1824)
 Il Parini, ovvero Della Gloria, (Parini, or On Glory)(July 6 / August 30, 1824)
 Dialogo di Federico Ruysch e delle sue mummie, (Dialogue between Frederick Ruysch and his mummies)(August 16 / August 23, 1824)
 Detti memorabili di Filippo Ottonieri, (Memorable sayings about Filippo Ottonieri)(August 29 / September 26, 1824)
 Dialogo di Cristoforo Colombo e di Pietro Gutierrez (Dialogue between Christopher Columbus and Peter Gutierrez)(October 19 / November 5, 1824)
 Elogio degli uccelli (Eulogy of the Birds)(October 29 / November 5, 1824)
 Cantico del gallo silvestre (Sylvan Rooster Chant)(November 10 / November 16, 1824)
 Frammento apocrifo di Stratone da Lampsaco, (Apocryphal passage of Strato of Lampsacus)(autumn 1825)
 Il Copernico, (Copernicus)(1827)
 Dialogo di Plotino e Porfirio, (Dialogue between Plotinus and Porphyry)(1827)
 Dialogo di un venditore d'almanacchi e di un passeggere (Dialogue between an almanac seller and a passer-by)(1832)
 Dialogo di Tristano e di un amico (Dialogue between Tristano and a Friend)(1832)

References

1827 non-fiction books
Works by Giacomo Leopardi
Italian-language works
Philosophy books
Satirical books
Works about philosophical pessimism